The Selima Stakes is an American Thoroughbred horse race held annually at Laurel Park Racecourse in Laurel, Maryland. Raced in late November, it is open to two-year-old fillies and is raced on turf.

History 
Inaugurated in 1926, it is named for Selima, who was imported to Maryland in 1750 and became a foundation mare by Benjamin Tasker Jr. at the Belair Stud Farm in Prince George County. Selima was the daughter of the Godolphin Arabian, she was considered "queen of the turf", she also gained fame as one of the country's greatest broodmares in American history.  Referring to the 1959 Selima Stakes, in his book Legacies of the Turf, author Edward L. Bowen says that it was "then one of the most important autumn races for juvenile fillies."

Modern times
The race was run as a grade one race from 1973 through 1988. It was a grade two race in 1989 and a grade three race from 1990 through 1999.  Since 2002 it has been contested over a distance of  miles (8.5 furlongs). The race was cancelled in 2008 for economic reasons. It was announced by Laurel Park that the famed race would be restored in 2011 and run on October 15 at 6 furlongs.

Records

Speed record: 
  miles – 1:52.16 – Jostle  (1999)
  miles – 1:41.87 – J'Ray (2005)
 1 mile – 1:38.00 – Nellie Flag  (1934)
  furlongs – 1:30.20 – Stormy Blues  (1994)

Most wins by a trainer:
 6 – Woody Stephens (1973, 1976, 1979, 1980, 1982, 1983)
 4 – Max Hirsch    (1935, 1946, 1959 & 1961)
 3 – Sunny Jim Fitzsimmons   (1932, 1954 & 1962)

Most wins by a jockey:
 5 – Edgar Prado  (1991, 1993, 1996, 1997 & 1998)
 3 – Laffit Pincay Jr.   (1970, 1973 & 1980)
 3 – Eddie Arcaro   (1934, 1935 & 1944)

Most wins by an owner:
 4 – King Ranch   (1935, 1946, 1959 & 1961)  
 4 – Wheatley Stable    (1932, 1954, 1962 & 1969)
 3 – Calumet Farm    (1934, 1943 & 1947)

Winners of the Selima Stakes since 1926

See also 

 Selima Stakes top three finishers

References

Bibliography
 The Selima Stakes at Pedigree Query

Horse races in Maryland
Laurel Park Racecourse
Flat horse races for two-year-old fillies
Turf races in the United States
Previously graded stakes races in the United States
Discontinued horse races
Recurring sporting events established in 1926
1926 establishments in Maryland